Robin Jonsson (born December 10, 1983) is a Swedish former professional ice hockey player. He currently plays with Luleå HF of the Swedish Hockey League (SHL). Jonsson was selected by the St. Louis Blues in the 4th round (120th overall) of the 2002 NHL Entry Draft.

Playing career
After suffering cancer early in his career Jonsson missed almost the entire 2002–03 season. But he did survive the cancer and came back to hockey. After playing with second-league team Bofors IK Jonsson moved back to elite team Färjestads BK, where is played as a junior, in the summer of 2003.

In January 2007 he was still playing for Färjestad, but with Bofors during brief loan-periods in the 2003–04 and 2004–05 seasons. In 2006, he won the Swedish Championship with Färjestad. In November 2007 he made his debut for the Swedish national team in a tournament in Finland.

On February 16, 2015, Jonsson announced that he was retiring as a player due to injuries.

Career statistics

Regular season and playoffs

International

References

External links

1983 births
Living people
Bofors IK players
Färjestad BK players
Luleå HF players
People from Upplands Väsby Municipality
St. Louis Blues draft picks
Swedish ice hockey defencemen
Timrå IK players
Sportspeople from Stockholm County